Aconius Catullinus  Philomatius ( 338–349 AD) was a Roman senator who held high state offices under the emperor Constans.

Biography 
Aconius (or Aco) Catullinus was probably a son of the identically-named senator who served as governor of Africa in 317–318. He was a pagan.

He was consul suffectus at an unknown date, and served as governor of Gallaecia in Hispania before 338. A dedication of his to Jupiter Optimus Maximus during his term of office has been preserved. In 338–339, Catullinus served as vicarius of Africa, and is attested on 24 June 341 as praetorian prefect of Italy. From 6 July 342 to 11 April 344, he served as urban prefect of Rome. A law (Codex Theodosianus, 16.10.3) addressed to (and likely suggested by) him, dated 1 November 342 during his term of office, concerns the preservation of pagan temples. Catullinus was consul ordinarius in 349.

Catullinus had a daughter, Aconia Fabia Paulina, who married the senator Vettius Agorius Praetextatus.

According to the Chronograph of 354, Catullinus bore the informal name Philomatius, which some authors have emended to Philomathius (meaning love of learning), but Salway suggested instead Philematius, from the Greek  (kiss).

Footnotes

References
 
 
 

4th-century Romans
Late-Roman-era pagans
Imperial Roman consuls
Praetorian prefects of Italy
Roman governors of Gallaecia
Senators of the Roman Empire
Suffect consuls of Imperial Rome
Urban prefects of Rome
Vicarii